The 2nd Regiment of Light Dragoons was a unit of the U.S. Army in the early nineteenth century. It was first activated in 1812. The regiment was consolidated with the 1st Regiment of Light Dragoons on May 12, 1814, forming the Regiment of Light Dragoons.

Background
An act of Congress on January 11, 1812 authorized an additional regiment of light Dragoons. By June 1812, the regiment had been activated.

Organization
Although the regiment was organized on January 11, 1812 the regimental colonel, James Burn, was not appointed until April 25. Secretary of War William Eustis delayed recruiting for almost a month, then allowed recruitment of only three out of twelve companies. No clothing or equipment was supplied until September and October. The regiment was not fully equipped until December. Purchase of horses had been ordered in March but by September only half the regiment was mounted; many of its mounts were unfit for service. Eustis scattered the regiment from the Ohio River to New England. One company disappeared from the War Department's records.

While stationed at Sackett's Harbor, New York, both the 1st and 2nd Regiments had their strength increased by the transfer of soldiers from the 26th Infantry Regiment.

Service
Neither the 1st Regiment nor the 2nd Regiment were used as consolidated units during the War of 1812. Generals frequently used their assigned dragoons as escorts, couriers and scouts rather than fighting men.

Raid at Mississinewa
William Henry Harrison ordered Colonel John B. Campbell of the 19th Infantry to lead a force which included Major James Ball's squadron (including Captain Samuel Hopkins's troop) of the 2nd Regiment of Light Dragoons from Fort Greenville, Ohio to attack a cluster of Miami Indian villages on the Mississinewa River. On December 17, 1812, Campbell's force attacked and destroyed the principle village. The Miami counterattacked before dawn on December 18 and, although Campbell and his soldiers persevered, they suffered ten dead and thirty-eight wounded. Campbell retreated to Fort Greenville. The expedition suffered the loss of over one hundred horses and more than three hundred men were disabled by frostbite. More than one hundred dragoons were temporary or permanent but non-fatal, casualties.

Fort Meigs
On April 28, 1813, General Procter and Tecumseh attempted to lure U.S. troops, including Major Ball's re-constituted 2nd Squadron into a battle outside Fort Meigs, Ohio. The U.S. forces held their ground inside the fort and the British and Indians broke off the attack.

Battle of Fort George
The regiment participated in the attack on Fort George, Upper Canada in May 1813.

Raiding Farms
On July 6, 1813. Two hundred or three hundred American dragoons of the 2nd regiment and American infantry raided farms taking provisions and supplies before withdrawing back to American lines.

Raid to capture a British Commander
An American named James Rouse and 2 other American Dragoons of the 2nd Regiment ventured out of fort George around July 9, 1813 to capture a British commander named Captain Jacob A. Ball. James Rouse and his 2 fellow dragoons raided the house where captain Ball was staying at. Rouse and his dragoons captured Jacob A. Ball and 8 of his fellow British guards. James Rouse and his dragoons returned back to Fort George safely with all 9 British prisoners including Captain Ball.

Ball’s Battlefield
On July 30, 1813. Major James Ball and his Dragoons of the 2nd Regiment escorted Colonel Wells to Fort Stephenson to relieve Major Croghan who was about to be besieged by a large combined British-Indian force. While the Dragoons were continuing to travel on the road, they are ambushed by British-allied Indians. Major Ball ordered his dragoons to charge and the Dragoons charged with their sabres killing 17 Indian warriors. The Indians retreated leaving the American Dragoons the victors on the field. The American Dragoons suffered none killed or wounded.

Battle of Thames
On September 27, 1813, Ball and his dragoons, although dismounted, accompanied Harrison on his invasion of Canada at Amherstburg. The squadron captured a bridge over the Aux Canards River.

Raid on capturing British shipping
On October 25, 1813. At least 25 Dragoons from the 2nd Regiment took part in an amphibious guerrilla raid with American militia privateers in a raid on British shipping. The American Dragoons and militia rode in some small boats and a bigger boat called the Smuggler Catcher. The Dragoons and militia captured 7 boats and their cargo, then withdrew back to American territory with their prizes. On December 30, 1813. All the militia privateers got their share of the prize money, but the Dragoons did not receive any of the prize money.

Raid on Saint David’s
On July 22, 1814. Joseph Willcocks with 200-300 men which included American dragoons of the 2nd Regiment made a surprise raid on Saint David’s where there were 4 Canadian militiamen. The Americans under Willcocks came around by the mountain and surrounded the house where the Canadian militiamen were staying surprising the Canadians. The Canadian militiamen went up stairs and opened fire through the windows with their muskets killing 1 American dragoon and wounding a few horses. The Canadian militiamen refused to surrender until the American dragoon captain Harrison stepped forward into the open and persuaded the Canadian militiamen to surrender. The Canadian militia surrendered. Joseph Willcocks and his fellow American raiders destroyed the house that the Canadian militia took shelter in. Then Willcocks and his fellow American raiders withdrew back to American territory with their 4 Canadian prisoners.

Notes

References

Dragoon regiments of the United States Army
Military units and formations established in 1812
Military units and formations disestablished in 1815
American military units and formations of the War of 1812